Shipman Knotts is a fell in the English Lake District in Cumbria, England. Although not one of the best-known Lake District fells (and strictly speaking it is just the southern shoulder of Kentmere Pike), it earned a separate chapter in Alfred Wainwright’s Pictorial Guide to the Lakeland Fells due to “Its characteristic roughness . . . rocky outcrops are everywhere on its steep slopes”.

Topography
The ridge from Shipman Knotts to Kentmere Pike climbs due north as far as the cairned top of  Goat Scar, before turning north-west to reach the summit of Kentmere Pike. A dry-stone wall follows the ridge, although in places it zigzags abruptly off the watershed. The eastern face above Longsleddale is steeper and includes Rough Crags and Goat Scar itself. The western face is rough but, after the initial climb out of Kentmere, has shallower gradients. There are small areas of mixed woodland on both sides.

South of Shipman Knotts, across the unnamed walkers’ pass from Kentmere to Longsleddale, is a broad upland area between the two valleys. This continues for five miles (eight kilometres) to the confluence of the Sprint and Kent at Burneside. There are a number of lower hills within this area, including Hollow Moor (described under "Green Quarter Fell" in Wainwright's The Outlying Fells of Lakeland) and Brunt Knott (described under "Potter Fell" in the same book). This ridge is also decorated by an unusual number of tarns for the south-eastern Lake District, the principal waterbodies being Skeggles Water, Gurnal Dubs and Potter Tarn.

Summit
The summit consists of three rocky hummocks on the east side of the wall. The middle one is considered the highest point and gives a good view of Longsleddale, although much of the view is restricted by nearby fells of a higher elevation.

Ascents
The ascent from Kentmere village takes the track which goes up west towards the valley of Longsleddale, crossing the ridge to the south of Shipman Knotts. A dry-stone wall is then followed northerly from the summit of the pass to reach the top of the fell.

References

Fells of the Lake District